Guldara (also Gūḏāra, Gudara, or Gowdārah) is a village and the center of Guldara District, Kabul Province, Afghanistan. The village was almost fully destroyed and now is continuing the process of rehabilitation. A new clinic has  been opened. A local NGO, Afghan Educational and Rehabilitation Organisation (AERO) is running this clinic which will provide family planning, child and general health services to a population of around 38,000 people.

See also 
Kabul Province

References

Populated places in Kabul Province